Krausnick-Groß Wasserburg (Lower sorbian: Kšušwica-Wódowy Grod) is a municipality in the district of Dahme-Spreewald in Brandenburg in Germany. Tropical Islands Resort, the biggest free-standing hall in the world, is located in Krausnick.

Geography 
In the middle of the heavily wooded municipality of Krausnick-Groß Wasserburg rise the Krausnick hills (also called the Bergspreewald or Bergspree Woods), which reach a maximum elevation of 144 m above sea level at the summit of the Wehlaberg, and rise about 100 metres above the adjacent Lower Spreewald woods. In the north of the area (in Groß Wasserburg) the  Rand Canal branches off the River Spree (Wasserburger Spree) and runs along the Baruth Urstromtal to the Köthener See, which is linked to the River Dahme by the Dahme Flood Relief Canal. The municipality lies ca. 60 km southeast of Berlin.

Demography

Detailed data sources are to be found in the Wikimedia Commons.

See also
Luchsee

References

Localities in Dahme-Spreewald